Jean Patrik Olsson (born 3 May 1990), known professionally as Patrik Jean, is a Swedish singer, songwriter and record producer. He has written or co-written songs for many artists, including the Mamas, Marcus & Martinus, and Felix Jaehn. He frequently works with fellow songwriters and producers Melanie Wehbe and Herman Gardarfve. He released his second extended play titled Consequence in November 2020.

Jean participated in Melodifestivalen 2021 with the song "Tears Run Dry", but failed to qualify to the finals.

Influences
Jean cited Whitney Houston, Sam Smith, Khalid, Frank Ocean, and Summer Walker as his influences.

Personal life
Patrik Jean came out as gay. He is in a relationship with photographer and video director Magnus Ragnvid.

Discography

Extended plays

Singles

Production discography

Melodifestivalen entries

References

Living people
1990 births
Swedish pop singers
21st-century Swedish male singers
Musicians from Stockholm
Swedish record producers
Swedish songwriters
Swedish LGBT singers
Swedish LGBT songwriters
Swedish gay musicians
Gay singers
Gay songwriters
LGBT record producers
20th-century LGBT people
21st-century LGBT people
Melodifestivalen contestants of 2021